The flag of Malta is a bicolour, with white in the hoist and red in the fly. A representation of the George Cross, awarded to Malta by George VI in 1942, is carried, edged with red, in the canton of the white stripe. The flag was first recognized in the May of 1952.

Colours

The red hue in the Maltese flag is officially documented as Pantone 186 C, RGB (207,20,43), Hex #CF142B or Spot Colour - 50% rubine red • 50% warm red.

The constitution of Malta also states that the white side must be on the hoist pole while the red side must be "in the fly"

Tradition states that the colours of the flag were given to Malta by Roger I of Sicily in 1091. Roger's fleet landed in Malta on the completion of the Norman conquest of Sicily. It is said that local Christians offered to fight by Roger's side against the Arab defenders. In order to recognize the locals fighting on his side from the defenders, Roger reportedly tore off part of his chequered red-and-white flag. However, this story has been debunked as a 19th-century myth, possibly even earlier due to the Mdina, Malta's old capital, associating its colours with Roger's in the late Middle Ages.

The white and red standard was reportedly used by Maltese insurgents during a rebellion against French occupation in September 1798.

The flag of the Knights of Malta, a white cross on a red field, was a more likely source of the Maltese colours, inspiring the red and white shield used during the British colonial period. The flag used by the knights was also known to be the oldest still-in-use national flag. The blue canton present in the 1943 to 1964 version of the flag was removed after Maltese independence, with the George cross instead given a red fimbriation.

The George Cross

The George Cross originally appeared on the flag placed on a blue canton (see List of flags of Malta). The flag was changed on 21 September 1964 with Malta's independence when the blue canton was replaced by a red fimbriation, the intention being that the Cross appear less prominent. His Majesty King George the Sixth bestowed the George Cross to Malta on April 15th, 1942. in recognition of its courageousness during World War II. The symbol was later officially added to the Maltese flag on the 28th of December 1943 despite symbolism being in circulation between April 1942 and December 1943 depicting the flag.

Campaign 
Recently, the emblem has been under consideration for removal, with an act passing in parliament in 1975 allowing the George Cross to be removed by a simple parliament majority with the reasoning being that the cross ties Malta to its turbulent, colonial past. A campaign on social media in 2013 further emphasized this point, coming up with an alternative of replacing it with the Maltese cross.

Civil ensign

The civil ensign shows a red field, bordered white and charged with a blank Maltese cross. It is also known as the Merchant's flag and/or the maritime flag of Malta.

Historical flags of Malta

See also 
Award of the George Cross to Malta
Coat of arms of Malta
Culture of Malta
Flags and symbols of Malta
List of flags of Malta

References

External links 

Flags, Symbols and their uses

1964 establishments in Malta
Flags introduced in 1964
National symbols of Malta
National flags
 
Red and white flags
Flags with crosses
Malta
Saint George and the Dragon